Convoy SC 7 was the seventh of the SC convoys, bound from Sydney, Nova Scotia across the 
North Atlantic to a number of British ports, mainly Liverpool. They were designated SC as their departure point was designated Sydney, Cape Breton in order to avoid confusion with Sydney in Australia. The convoys formed part of the battle of the Atlantic during the Second World War. Large numbers of merchants travelled together with naval escorts to protect against U-boat attacks. This problem was exacerbated by a shortage of suitable escorts from either the Royal Canadian Navy or the Royal Navy in the early stages of the war.

Convoy SC 7 left Sydney on 5 October 1940, consisting of 36 merchants initially escorted by the Canadian armed yacht  and the British sloop . Having seen the convoy out of Canadian waters, Elk turned back on 7 October leaving the convoy to spend three quarters of the crossing escorted by the lone Scarborough. One of the merchants,  had developed engine problems and also turned back.

Further sporadic attacks continued that day and the following, despite the arrival of the sloop  and the corvette . The night of 18/19 October saw the successful use of the wolf pack tactics of Germany's U-boat fleet. They sank 16 merchants in a six-hour period, bringing the total to twenty merchants sunk and a total tonnage lost of 79,592 Gross registered tons. The U-boats only broke off their attacks to intercept convoy HX 79 that had arrived in the area. They went on to sink a further 12 ships from this convoy, for a total of 28 ships sunk on 18/19 October, making this the deadliest two days of the battle of the Atlantic. The surviving merchants were gathered up by the remaining escorts and brought into port several days later.

Merchant ships

Escorts

U-boats

Notes

References
 Paul Lund, Harry Ludlam  : The Night of the U-Boats  ( 1973)  
 Stephen Roskill : The War at Sea 1939–1945  Vol I  (1954)         ISBN (none)
 Dan van  der Vat : The Atlantic Campaign (1988)  
 Arnold Hague : The Allied Convoy System 1939–1945 (2000). Canada .  UK

External links
A report on the convoy from public records
Convoy SC-7 at Uboat.net
SC-7 at Arnold Hague's convoy database

Convoy SC 007
SC007Order